The 2016 European Junior Shooting Championships (25/50m) were held in Männiku Shooting Range, Tallinn, Estonia from June 12 to 19,2016.

Men's events

Women's events

References

 http://www.esc-shooting.org/

European Junior Shooting Championships
European Junior Shooting Championships
2016 European Junior Shooting Championships
Sports competitions in Tallinn
21st century in Tallinn
June 2016 sports events in Europe